Helen Jamieson (born 9 December 1946 in Dundee) is a British former alpine skier who competed in the 1968 Winter Olympics.
She was educated at the High School of Dundee.

References

External links
 

1946 births
Living people
Sportspeople from Dundee
People educated at the High School of Dundee
Scottish female alpine skiers
Olympic alpine skiers of Great Britain
Alpine skiers at the 1968 Winter Olympics